The Rebel Armed Forces (FAR) was a Guatemalan guerrilla organization established in 1961 and lasting until the peace agreements in 1996.

In the late 1960s, the Guatemalan government began a United States-backed counter-insurgency campaign that killed between 2,800 and 8000 FAR supporters in eastern Guatemala. The survivors of this campaign, which devastated the FAR, regrouped in Mexico City in the 1970s, and founded the Guerrilla Army of the Poor (EGP), which succeeded in mobilizing tremendous popular support over the next few years.

FAR is most significantly known for having killed the U.S. ambassador to Guatemala, John Gordon Mein, in 1968. Also killed that year were two U.S. military advisers, Colonel John Webber and Ernest Munro, although they might have been killed at the command of PGT leader Leonardo Castillo Johnson.

In 1970, the group briefly kidnapped Guatemala's foreign minister Alberto Fuentes Mohr, but freed him in exchange for the release of a student leader. Karl von Spreti, German ambassador to Guatemala, was kidnapped and murdered by the FAR as well in that year. Further actions that year included the kidnapping of U.S. labor attaché Sean Holly, he was freed for the release of FAR prisoners.

Notes and references
References

Sources

See also
Revolutionary Movement 13th November

External links 
Collection of FAR documents

1961 establishments in Guatemala
Guatemalan Civil War
Guatemalan National Revolutionary Unity
Guerrilla movements in Latin America
Military units and formations disestablished in 1996
Military units and formations established in 1961
Paramilitary organizations based in Guatemala